British Punjabis are citizens or residents of the United Kingdom whose heritage originates wholly or partly in the Punjab, a region in the Indian subcontinent, which is divided between India and Pakistan. Numbering 1,200,000 in 2020, Punjabis represent the largest ethnicity among British Asians. They are a major sub-group of the British-Indian and British Pakistani communities.

History
The United Kingdom is home to the largest Punjabi diaspora Outside of India. Immigration from the Punjab region to the UK began during the colonial era, when Punjab was a province of British India. Punjabi migrants in the nineteenth and early twentieth centuries were mainly domestic servants, seamen working on British merchant ships and visiting civil servants or students seeking professional qualifications. A notable early figure was Duleep Singh, former Maharajah of the Sikh Empire, who was exiled to Britain in 1853. His daughter Sophia Duleep Singh became a prominent suffragette and a pioneer of women's rights in Britain.

The first significant Punjabi migration began in the 1950s when labour shortages in the UK following the Second World War led the British administration to encourage recruitment from across the Commonwealth. The vast majority of these migrants were men from India and Pakistan, who after a period of acclimatisation began to settle permanently and invite their friends, wives and children to join them. These migrants often found work in the manufacturing, textile and service sectors, including a significant number at Heathrow Airport. The town of Southall in west London became an early hub for Punjabi migrants, and would become the country’s premier British Asian town, dubbed Little Punjab.

In the 1970s, there was widespread migration of Punjabis from East Africa, many of whom had retained their British passports following the independence of Kenya and Uganda. East African Punjabis are known as twice migrants, and came to the UK amidst growing discrimination at home, symbolised by the Expulsion of Asians from Uganda in 1972. Unlike earlier Punjabi migration to the UK, East African Punjabis migrated as families. Many were successful businessmen or professionals with savings and able to adjust quickly to life in Britain.

Demographics

In the 2011 UK Census, 273,000 people identified Punjabi as their first language. Of these, 271,000 were in England, 23,000 in Scotland, 1,600 in Wales and a smaller number in Northern Ireland. Thus, Punjabi is the third most commonly spoken language in the UK. The Southall area of Greater London is home to a significant Punjabi population. The total population of Punjabis in the UK is estimated to exceed 700,000.

Immigrants from the Pakistani province of Punjab are mainly Punjabi Muslims, with smaller numbers of Christians. The majority originate from the northern and central parts of Punjab, such as: Jhelum, Jhang, Faisalabad, Rawalpindi, The Pothwar, Gujranwala, Gujrat, Attock, Chakwal, Chiniot, Sargodha, Toba Tek Singh and Lahore. Punjabis are estimated to comprise one-third of the British Pakistani population, making up the second largest sub-group after Mirpuri Kashmiris. The tribes to which British Pakistani Punjabis belong include Jats, Gujjars, Awans, Arains, Rajputs and several others. 

The population of Indian Punjabis in the UK has been estimated at 466,563 in 2011, based on an earlier estimate that they constitute 45% of the British Indian community. Of these, majority are Sikhs while the rest are mainly Punjabi Hindus. The areas where they predominately originate from are Jalandhar, Amritsar, Ludhiana, Kapurthala, Bathinda, Hoshiarpur, Nawanshahr and Moga. The UK has the second largest Sikh diaspora outside India, after Canada.

Culture

Punjabi culture strongly defines the identity of British Punjabis. The bhangra form of music was popularised by Punjabi immigrants in the UK during the 1970s. England has long been associated with the Asian Underground scene which gave rise to Punjabi pop music, especially among the younger generations. Punjabi cuisine is also highly popular in the country. Chicken tikka masala has been called a "national dish" of Britain.

Punjabis are known for their entrepreneurial activities. Research by Teesside University shows that the British Punjabi community is one of the most highly educated and successful in the UK. Notable businesspeople include Surinder Arora who ranks amongst the wealthiest Britons. Other Punjabis have achieved notability in the theatres of British politics, sports and entertainment.

See also

List of British Punjabis
 British Indians
 British Pakistanis
 Punjabi diaspora
 Hinduism in the United Kingdom
 Sikhism in the United Kingdom

Notes

References

 
Indian diaspora in the United Kingdom
Pakistani diaspora in the United Kingdom
Punjabi diaspora by country